The Restaurant & Bar Design Awards, is an annual award dedicated to recognising the design and architecture of food and beverage spaces internationally. The Restaurant & Bar Design Awards is an independent award system, set up by Marco Rebora  in 2008 in the United Kingdom with the encouragement of a panel of judges, including the editor-in-chief of Wallpaper*, Tony Chambers.

Since the first awards in 2009 there have been over 10,000 entries from design and architectural industries and hospitality organisations from 100 countries around the world.

Each year the awards are judged by a new panel of representatives from the fields of art, architecture, design and gastronomy.  Notable judges have included Ian Callum, Mark Hix, Gerry Judah, Yotam Ottolenghi, Thomas Heatherwick, Julia Peyton-Jones and Karim Rashid. The winners are awarded at annual ceremonies at a chosen host venue affiliated with the award. In 2012 the ceremony was held at The Royal Institute of British Architects (RIBA).

Restaurant & Bar Design Awards organises a year-round programme of events based in the UK and most recently Internationally with an aim to build a network between entrants, judges, partners and sponsors.
 
In 2014 Taschen publications published a book, Restaurant & Bar Design dedicated to the ongoing work of the Awards.

Categories
Each year the Restaurant & Bar Design Awards acknowledges two overall winners under the categories of Best Bar and Best Restaurant.

The number of additional category winners varies each year. The inaugural award in 2008/2009 was open to entrants from UK and identified nine category winners. In 2009/10 the awards became International and introduced two more category winners under the titles International Restaurant and International Bar. The awards also have a number of sub-categories.

Overall Winners 
2009
 The Olde Bell Inn (Hurley, UK)  /   Studioilse 
 Carbon (London, UK) /   B3 Designers 
2010
 Galvin La Chapelle (London, UK)  /  DesignLSM 
 The Tote (India)  /   Serie Architects 
2011
 Busaba Eathai (Bicester, UK)  /   David Archer Architects 
 Smack (Leamington Spa, UK) / Steve Smith & Adrian Baynes
2012
 A Cantina (Spain)  / Estudio Nomada
 Graffiti (Bulgaria) /  Studio Mode 
2013
 Höst  (Denmark) /  NORM Architects 
 Atrium Champagne Bar  (London, UK) / Foster and Partners
2014
 FEI (China) / A.N.D.
 Les Haras (France)  /  Jouin Manku   
2015
 Dandelyan (London, UK) / Design Research Studio
 The Jane (Belgium) / Studio Piet Boon
2016
 Blue Wave (Barcelona, Spain) / El Equipo Creativo
 German Gymnasium (London, UK)  / Conran & Partners
2017
 Westlight (New York, USA) / Studio Munge
 The Penny Drop (Melbourne, Australia)  / Design by Golden
2018
 Rosina (Las Vegas, USA) / Simeone Deary Design Group under a consulting agreement with Gensler
 Sean Connolly (Dubai, UAE)  / Alexander & Co
2019
 SPINE Beirut (Beirut, Lebanon) / Gatserelia Design
 Alice & Fifth (Johannesburg, South Africa)  / TristanPlessisStudio
2020
 Garden Hotpot (Chengdu, China) / MUDA-Architects 
 INNS Bar (Chengdu, China)  / Wooton Designers
2021
 Leña at Hotel Puente Romano (Marbella, Spain) / Astet Studio
 More 7 Bar at The Linow Hotel (Xi'an, China) / Republican Metropolis Architecture
2022
 1111 Ones (Hong Kong, China) / M.R. Studio
 Curious at W Melbourne (Melbourne, Australia) / Hachem

References

External links
 http://www.restaurantandbardesignawards.com

Architecture awards
Food and drink awards
Hospitality industry awards
Hospitality industry in the United Kingdom